Walter Harold Griffiths (13 June 1884–1966) was an English footballer who played in the Football League for Barnsley.

References

1884 births
1966 deaths
English footballers
Association football forwards
English Football League players
Ilkeston United F.C. players
Barnsley F.C. players